Archibald Watson Wright (23 November 1924 – 30 April 1990) was a Scottish footballer, who played as an inside forward. He played for Hamilton Academical, Clyde, Falkirk, Blackburn Rovers, Grimsby Town and Accrington Stanley.

Wright was signed for a small fee by then Grimsby Town manager Bill Shankly in 1953.

He later became manager of Airdrieonians, and was in charge there as of December 1964.

References

Scottish footballers
Scottish football managers
Hamilton Academical F.C. players
Clyde F.C. players
Falkirk F.C. players
Blackburn Rovers F.C. players
Grimsby Town F.C. players
Accrington Stanley F.C. (1891) players
Clyde F.C. managers
1924 births
1990 deaths
Association football inside forwards
Scottish Football League players
English Football League players
Airdrieonians F.C. (1878) managers
Scottish Football League managers
Rutherglen Glencairn F.C. players